Santaquin (YTB-824) is a United States Navy  named for Santaquin, Utah.

Construction

The contract for Santaquin was awarded 9 August 1971. She was laid down on 5 March 1973 at Marinette, Wisconsin, by Marinette Marine and launched 13 August 1973.

Operational history

Sometime prior to 1991, Santaquin served in the Norfolk, Virginia area.

Sometime prior to 2009, Santaquin was reassigned to Naval Station Guantanamo Bay where she remains in active service.

Notes

References

External links
 

 

Natick-class large harbor tugs
1973 ships
Ships built by Marinette Marine